The 2019–20 season is the 121st season in the history of Leyton Orient Football Club, their 102nd in the Football League, and the first back in League Two for three years following promotion last season.

Transfers

Transfers in

Loans in

Loans out

Transfers out

Pre-season
The O's announced pre-season friendlies against Harlow Town, Hull City, Hornchurch, AFC Rushden & Diamonds, Dartford, Bishop's Stortford and Norwich City XI.

Competitions

League Two

League table

Results summary

Results by matchday

Matches
On Thursday, 20 June 2019, the EFL League Two fixtures were revealed.

FA Cup

The first round draw was made on 21 October 2019.

EFL Cup

The first round draw was made on 20 June.

EFL Trophy

On 9 July 2019, the pre-determined group stage draw was announced with Invited clubs to be drawn on 12 July 2019. The draw for the second round was made on 16 November 2019 live on Sky Sports.

Player Statistics

|-
! colspan="14" style="background:#dcdcdc; text-align:center"| Goalkeepers

|-
! colspan="14" style="background:#dcdcdc; text-align:center"| Defenders

|-
! colspan="14" style="background:#dcdcdc; text-align:center"| Midfielders

|-
! colspan="14" style="background:#dcdcdc; text-align:center"| Forwards

|-
! colspan="14" style="background:#dcdcdc; text-align:center"| Out on Loan

|-
! colspan="14" style="background:#dcdcdc; text-align:center"| Retired During the Season

|-

Top scorers
Includes all competitive matches. The list is sorted by squad number when total goals are equal.

Last updated 7 March 2020.

References

Leyton Orient F.C. seasons
Leyton Orient